Casper and Abraham Shafer Grist Mill Complex is located in Stillwater Township, Sussex County, New Jersey, United States. The mill was built in 1764 and rebuilt after an 1844 fire and was added to the National Register of Historic Places on December 10, 2009.

See also
 Casper Shafer
 National Register of Historic Places listings in Sussex County, New Jersey

References

Commercial buildings completed in 1764
Buildings and structures in Sussex County, New Jersey
National Register of Historic Places in Sussex County, New Jersey
Stillwater Township, New Jersey
Grinding mills in New Jersey
New Jersey Register of Historic Places
1764 establishments in New Jersey
Grinding mills on the National Register of Historic Places in New Jersey